FC Costuleni was a Moldovan football club based in Costuleni, Ungheni, Moldova. They played in the Divizia Naţională, the top division in Moldovan football.

History
The club participated for the first time in the "B" Division (North) in the 2008–09 season and won it.

In 2009–10, FC Costuleni won the "A" Division and promoted to the highest tier of Moldovan football Moldovan National Division.

After few months spent at Rapid Ghidighici, on 24 June 2013 Italian businessman Pietro Belardelli acquired FC Costuleni from Iurie Chirinciuc at a symbolic price of one Moldovan leu. Former owner Iurie Chirinciuc had to be the club's honorary president, and Pietro Belardelli to manage and finance the club. However, after few months Belardelli wasn't anymore interested in managing FC Costuleni and Iurie Chirinciuc re-took the ownership over the club.

At the end November 2014, FC Costuleni has been withdrawn from the championship after 12 matches played, the newly appointed club's president, Andrei Grigor, reasoning the decision by the fact that the team will not succeed to achieve its objectives to accede in European competitions by the end of the season. The club's honorary president, Iurie Chirinciuc, has stated that the team has financial problems, and added that "FC Costuleni doesn't disappear, but just has been withdrawn from the championship".

Achievements
Divizia A
 Winners (1): 2009–10

Divizia B
 Winners (1): 2008–09

League results

References

External links
  
 FC Costuleni at DiviziaNationala.com 

 
Football clubs in Moldova
Association football clubs established in 2008
FC Costuleni
FC Costuleni
Association football clubs disestablished in 2014
Defunct football clubs in Moldova